Nechilo is a genus of moths of the family Crambidae. It contains only one species, Nechilo macrogona, which is found in Australia, where it has been recorded from Victoria.

References

Natural History Museum Lepidoptera genus database

Crambinae
Crambidae genera
Monotypic moth genera
Taxa named by Stanisław Błeszyński